Don Kwasnycia (born 30 April 1952) is a Canadian sports shooter. He competed in the mixed skeet event at the 1988 Summer Olympics.

References

External links
 

1952 births
Living people
Canadian male sport shooters
Olympic shooters of Canada
Shooters at the 1988 Summer Olympics
Sportspeople from Toronto
Pan American Games medalists in shooting
Pan American Games silver medalists for Canada
Pan American Games bronze medalists for Canada
Shooters at the 1987 Pan American Games
Shooters at the 1995 Pan American Games
Commonwealth Games medallists in shooting
Commonwealth Games silver medallists for Canada
Shooters at the 1986 Commonwealth Games
20th-century Canadian people
Medallists at the 1986 Commonwealth Games